Milton Keynes Dons Football Club is an English professional association football club based in Denbigh, Milton Keynes, which was established in 2004. Following the controversial relocation of Wimbledon F.C. to Milton Keynes in September 2003, Wimbledon F.C. was renamed Milton Keynes Dons F.C. along with a change of club crest and team colours in June 2004. Between August 2004 and July 2007, the club played their games at a temporary home of the National Hockey Stadium whilst their purpose-built permanent home of Stadium MK was under construction. Since 2004, the club have remained within The Football League. Having reached the Championship in 2015, their highest ever league status, as of the 2019–20 season, they currently play in League One, the third tier of English football, following promotion at the end of the 2018–19 season.

The list below encompasses major and minor honours won by Milton Keynes Dons, records set by the club, their managers and their players. The player records section itemises the club's leading goalscorers and those who have made most appearances in first-team competitions. It also records notable achievements by Milton Keynes Dons players on the international stage, and the highest transfer fees paid and received by the club. Attendance records at the National Hockey Stadium, as well as the club's current home, Stadium MK.

All records and figures are correct and up to date as of 8 May 2022.

Honours

League
 Football League One
 Runners-up: 2014–15
 Football League Two / EFL League Two
 Champions: 2007–08
 Third-place (promotion): 2018–19

Cup
 Football League Trophy
 Winners: 2007–08
 Berks & Bucks Senior Cup
 Winners: 2006–07
 Runners-up: 2005–06, 2017–18
 Portimão Cup
 Winners: 2004

Source: MKDons.com

Player records

Appearances

 Most club appearances: Dean Lewington, 859
 Most league appearances: Dean Lewington, 744
 Most FA Cup appearances: Dean Lewington, 46
 Most League Cup appearances: Dean Lewington, 27
 Most League Trophy appearances: Dean Lewington, 32
 Longest serving player: Dean Lewington, from 1 July 2004 until present (18 years, 52 days as of 22 August 2022)
 Youngest first-team player: Brendan Galloway, 15 years, 241 days (against Nantwich Town, FA Cup first round, 12 November 2011)
 Oldest first-team player: Alex Rae, 40 years, 211 days (against Brighton & Hove Albion, League One, 1 May 2010)

Most appearances
Competitive matches only (does not include pre-season friendlies or testimonials). Includes appearances as a substitute. Numbers in brackets indicate goals scored.

a. Names in bold are current first team squad members.
b. Goals and appearances (including those as a substitute) in the Football League Trophy and Football League Play-offs.

Firsts
 First club captain: Mark Williams
 First Football League goalscorer: Izale McLeod, against Barnsley, League One, 7 August 2004
 First FA Cup goalscorer: Wade Small, against Lancaster City, FA Cup first round, 13 November 2004
 First League Cup goalscorer: Izale McLeod, against Peterborough United, League Cup first round, 24 August 2004
 First League Trophy goalscorer: Richard Pacquette, against Brentford, League Trophy first round, 28 September 2004
 First hat-trick: Clive Platt, against Barnet, League Two, 20 January 2007
 First red card: Harry Ntimban-Zeh, against Cardiff City, League Cup second round, 21 September 2004

Goalscorers
 Most goals in a season (all competitions): Izale McLeod, 24 goals (in the 2006–07 season).
 Most league goals in a season: Izale Mcleod, 21 goals (in League Two, 2006–07)
 Most goals in a single match: 2 players - Scott Twine, 4 goals (against Plymouth Argyle, League One, 30 April 2022), Will Grigg, 4 goals (against Swindon Town, League One, 24 April 2021)
 Youngest goalscorer: George C Williams, 16 years, 65 days (against Nantwich Town, FA Cup first round, 12 November 2011)
 Youngest hat-trick scorer: Dele Alli, 17 years, 330 days (against Notts County, League One, 11 March 2014)
 Oldest goalscorer: Bradley Johnson, 35 years, 227 days (against Portsmouth FC, League One, 17th December 2022)

Top goalscorers
Competitive matches only. Numbers in brackets indicate appearances made.

a. Names in bold are current first team squad members.
b. Goals and appearances (including those as a substitute) in the Football League Trophy and the Football League Play-offs.

Top goalscorers by season
Competitive matches only.

a. Names in bold are current first team squad members.

International
The following players received the following full international caps whilst still a registered player at Milton Keynes Dons (does not include players on loan from other clubs):

  Simon Church (9 caps)
  Lee Hodson (7 caps)
  Mark Williams (6 caps)
  Ali Gerba (5 caps)
  Ben Reeves (2 caps)
  Jermaine Easter (1 cap)
  Craig Morgan (1 cap)

Transfers
Record transfer fees paid

Record transfer fees received

Managerial records
The following managerial records apply only to permanently appointed managers of the club and not caretaker managers:

 First manager: Stuart Murdoch, 1 July 2004 to 8 November 2004
 Longest-serving manager: Karl Robinson – 6 years, 174 days (10 May 2010 to 23 October 2016)
 Highest win percentage: Roberto di Matteo, 55.00%
 Lowest win percentage: Dan Micciche, 18.75%
 Youngest manager (on appointment): Karl Robinson – 29 years, 237 days 
 Oldest manager (on appointment): Stuart Murdoch – 53 years, 315 days

Club records

Progression
 Highest league finish: 23rd, Championship, 2015–16
 Furthest FA Cup progression: Fifth round, 2012–13
 Furthest EFL Cup progression: Fourth round, 2014–15
 Furthest EFL Trophy progression: Winners, 2007–08

Attendances

This section applies to attendances for matches involving the first team at the National Hockey Stadium, the club's (temporary) first home between 2004 and 2007, and Stadium MK, the club's present home.

 Highest attendance at Stadium MK: 28,521, against Liverpool, EFL Cup third round, 25 September 2019
 Lowest attendance at Stadium MK: 1,018, against Brighton & Hove Albion U21s, EFL Trophy group stage, 13 November 2018
 Highest attendance at the National Hockey Stadium: 8,426, against Bradford City, League One, 25 February 2006
 Lowest attendance at the National Hockey Stadium: 2,065 against Lancaster City, FA Cup first round, 13 November 2004

Matches

Firsts
 First competitive match: Milton Keynes Dons 1–1 Barnsley, League One, 7 August 2004
 First Football League match: Milton Keynes Dons 1–1 Barnsley, League One, 7 August 2004
 First FA Cup match: Milton Keynes Dons 1–0 Lancaster City, FA Cup first round, 13 November 2004
 First League Cup match: Peterborough United 0–3 Milton Keynes Dons, League Cup first round, 24 August 2004
 First League Trophy match: Brentford 0–3 Milton Keynes Dons, League Trophy southern section first round, 28 September 2004
 First match at the National Hockey Stadium: Milton Keynes Dons 1–1 Barnsley, League One, 7 August 2004
 First match at Stadium MK: Milton Keynes Dons 4–3 Chelsea XI, friendly, 18 July 2007

Record wins
 Record league win: Milton Keynes Dons 7–0 Oldham Athletic, League One, 20 December 2014
 Record FA Cup win: Milton Keynes Dons 6–0 Nantwich Town, FA Cup first round, 12 November 2011
 Record League Cup win: Milton Keynes Dons 4–0 Manchester United, League Cup second round, 26 August 2014
 Record League Trophy win: Milton Keynes Dons 6–0 Norwich City U21, EFL Trophy round of 32, 8 December 2020

Record defeats
 Record league defeat (joint): 
  0–5 against Hartlepool United, League One, 3 January 2005
  0–5 against Huddersfield Town, League One, 18 February 2006
  0–5 against Rochdale, League Two, 27 January 2007
  0–5 against Carlisle United, League One, 13 February 2010
  0–5 against Burnley, Championship, 12 January 2016
 Record FA Cup defeat: Milton Keynes Dons 1–5 Chelsea, FA Cup fourth round, 31 January 2016
 Record League Cup defeat: Milton Keynes Dons 0–6 Southampton, League Cup third round, 23 September 2015
 Record League Trophy defeat: Milton Keynes Dons 0–4 Chelsea U21, EFL Trophy second round, 6 December 2017

Goals
 Most goals scored in a season (all competitions): 117 in 53 games, 2014–15
 Fewest goals scored in a season (all competitions): 48 in 52 games, 2015–16
 Most goals conceded in a season (all competitions) (joint):
 84 in 56 games, 2009–10
 84 in 52 games, 2015–16
 Fewest goals conceded in a season (all competitions): 48 in 55 games, 2007–08
 Most league goals scored  in a season: 101 in 46 games, League One, 2014–15
 Fewest league goals scored in a season: 39 in 46 games, Championship, 2015–16
 Most league goals conceded in a season (joint): 
 69 in 46 games, Championship, 2015–16
 69 in 46 games, League One, 2017–18
 Fewest league goals conceded in a season: 37 in 46 games, League Two, 2007–08

Points
 Most points in a season: 92 in 46 matches, League Two, 2007–08
 Fewest points in a season: 39 in 46 matches, Championship, 2015–16

Runs
 Longest league winning run: 8 matches, League Two, 2007–08
 Longest league unbeaten run: 18 matches, League Two, 2007–08
 Longest league winless run: 12 matches, League One, 2019–20
 Longest league losing run: 6 matches, League One, 2017–18

Clean sheets
 Most clean sheets in a season as a team (league): 19 matches, League Two, 2007–08
 Fewest clean sheets in a season as a team (league): 8 matches, League One, 2005–06
 Most clean sheets in a season as a team (all competitions): 22 matches, 2007–08
 Fewest clean sheets in a season as a team (all competitions): 8 matches, 2005–06

Penalty shoot-outs

References

External links

Official Supporters Association website
MK Dons news on MKWeb

Records And Statistics
Milton Keynes Dons